Najmuddin Shaikh (born 4 September 1939) served as the Pakistani ambassador to United States (1990–1991) and later served as Foreign Secretary of Pakistan (1994 - 1997).

Education and family
He received his bachelor's degree from Sindh University.
He is a graduate of Tufts University's Fletcher School of Law and Diplomacy (1962). His wife, Raana Shaikh, has served as the Managing Director of Pakistan Television, and earlier as Secretary for the Ministry of Culture. He is the brother of Air Marshal Riazuddin Shaikh.

Career
Shaikh joined the Foreign Service of Pakistan in 1961. During his 38 years of service, he served as Pakistan's ambassador to Canada (1987–1989), ambassador to West Germany (1989–1990), ambassador to the United States (1990–1991) and ambassador to Iran (1992–1994). He then served as Foreign Secretary from 1994 to 1997, later replaced by Shamshad Ahmad. He has also served as Pakistan's special envoy to Yemen, Sudan, Kenya and Bahrain (February 2005).

Other activities
Shaikh has been a member of the board of governors of the Institute of Strategic Studies, Islamabad and senior vice president of the Karachi Council of Foreign Relations. He used to write a weekly column on foreign affairs for the Dawn newspaper and now writes for the Daily Pakistan newspaper.

References

External links
List of Najmuddin Shaikh columns in Daily Times newspaper
Najmuddin Shaikh as a columnist on Dawn newspaper

Foreign Secretaries of Pakistan
High Commissioners of Pakistan to Canada
Ambassadors of Pakistan to West Germany
Ambassadors of Pakistan to the United States
Ambassadors of Pakistan to Iran
1939 births
Living people
Sindhi people
University of Sindh alumni
The Fletcher School at Tufts University alumni